Against the Law may refer to:
 Against the Law (1950 film), a 1950 Italian film
 Against the Law (1997 film), a 1997 American film
 Against the Law (album), a 1990 album by Stryper
 Against the Law (EP), an EP by Defiance
 Against the Law (TV film), a 2017 British TV film
 Against the Law (TV series), an American TV series
 Against the Law, the memoirs of British writer and gay rights campaigner Peter Wildeblood